Jesús Cabrero Mora (born 28 July 1981 in La Sotonera, Aragon) is a Spanish former professional footballer who played as a goalkeeper.

External links

1981 births
Living people
People from Hoya de Huesca
Sportspeople from the Province of Huesca
Spanish footballers
Footballers from Aragon
Association football goalkeepers
Segunda División players
Segunda División B players
Real Zaragoza B players
CD Binéfar players
CF Palencia footballers
RCD Mallorca B players
Burgos CF footballers
FC Cartagena footballers
SD Ponferradina players
Albacete Balompié players
SD Huesca footballers
Recreativo de Huelva players
RCD Mallorca players
Spain youth international footballers